R68 may refer to:
 R68 (New York City Subway car)
 R68 (South Africa), a road
 BMW R68, a motorcycle
 , a destroyer of the Royal Navy
 , an aircraft carrier of the Royal Navy
 R68: Possible risk of irreversible effects, a risk phrase